Pearly penile papules (PPP) are benign small bumps on the human penis. They vary in size from 1–4 mm, are pearly or flesh-colored, smooth and dome-topped or filiform, and appear in one or several rows around the corona, the ridge of the head of the penis and sometimes on the penile shaft. They are painless, non-cancerous and not harmful.

Symptoms and signs
PPPs are small bumps on the human penis. They vary in size from 1–4 mm, are pearly or flesh-colored, smooth and dome-topped or filiform, and appear in one or several rows around the corona, the ridge of the glans and sometimes on the penile shaft. They are painless, non-cancerous and not harmful.

Cause and mechanism

PPPs are a type of angiofibroma. Their function is not well-understood. They are sometimes described as vestigial remnants of penile spines, sensitive features found in the same location in other primates. PPPs secrete oil that moistens the glans of the penis. They do not spread and often spontaneously regress. Along with Fordyce glands PPPs secrete oils to keep the skin of the head of penis in good condition. Smegma can accumulate if these oils are produced in excess or there is inadequate washing under the foreskin.

Diagnosis
Diagnosis is by visualisation. On dermoscopy, the white-pink papules appear in a cobblestone-like pattern and contain a central dotted or comma-shaped blood vessels. There is no scale. PPPs are sometimes mistaken for genital warts due to a perceived similarity in appearance. They can also appear similar to molluscum contagiosum, sebaceous hyperplasia and lichen nitidus. Histopathology shows dense connective tissue, fibroblasts and many blood vessels.

Treatment 

Generally, reassurance is given and no treatment is needed. Laser or cryotherapy may be considered for men who find PPPs distressing to look at or feel excessive embarrassment. 

Carbon dioxide laser generally has good outcomes with skin healing within seven days. The procedure requires anaesthesia, may need to be performed more than once, and has a risk of bleeding, scarring and colour changes. Another procedure involves a hyfrecator.

Epidemiology
PPPs are common and occur in 14% to 48% of young males. They are less common in circumcised males, occurring about half as frequently in circumcised men.

Social and cultural 
Some men find PPPs distressing to look at, owing to their resemblance to some sexually transmitted infections. Although it is not related to any disease, PPPs are occasionally mistaken for HPV warts. There are also home remedies for "curing" it, despite the fact that the papules are neither infectious nor detrimental to one's health and may have beneficial functions. Some of the "home remedies" found on the Internet and elsewhere use mild ointments or creams to soften the papules, but others are physically dangerous techniques for papule removal which can result in irreversible damage.

Rapini et al. advise that, since dermatologists have safe, effective ways to remove the papules if desired, home remedies involving corrosive substances or self-surgery should be avoided, since they can permanently damage sexual functioning. Rapini et al. further state that removal should only be performed by a physician using proven medical techniques.

References

External links 

Dermal and subcutaneous growths
Human penis anatomy
Andrology
Human male reproductive system